In 1939, The National Broadcasting Company's (NBC) Red and Blue radio networks competed with the Columbia Broadcasting System (CBS) and the Mutual Broadcasting System in providing nationwide coverage. NBC advertising rate cards of the period listed "basic" and "supplemental" affiliated stations. Advertisers were encouraged to buy time for their programs on the full "basic" line-up (plus any "supplemental" stations they wished) but this was open to negotiation. It was not unusual for Red Network advertisers to place shows on Blue Network stations in certain markets (and the other way around). Supplemental stations were generally located in smaller cities away from the network trunk lines. Such stations were usually offered to advertisers on both the Red and Blue Network line-ups.

East affiliates

Basic

 WEAF (New York, New York)
 CBM (Montreal, Quebec, Canada)
 KYW (Philadelphia, Pennsylvania)
 WBEN (Buffalo, New York)
 WCAE (Pittsburgh, Pennsylvania)
 WCSH (Portland, Maine)
 WDEL (Wilmington, Delaware)
 WFBR (Baltimore, Maryland)
 WGY (Schenectady. New York)
 WJAR (Providence, Rhode Island)
 WNAC (Boston, Massachusetts)
 WRC (Washington, D.C.)
 WTAG (Worcester, Massachusetts)
 WTAM (Cleveland, Ohio)
 WTIC (Hartford, Connecticut)
 WWJ (Detroit, Michigan)

Supplemental

 CBF (Montreal, Quebec, Canada)
 CBL (Toronto, Ontario, Canada)
 CMQ (Havana, Cuba)
 WBRE (Wilkes-Barre, Pennsylvania)
 WCOL (Columbus, Ohio)
 WEEU (Reading, Pennsylvania)
 WFEA (Manchester, New Hampshire)
 WGAL (Lancaster, Pennsylvania)
 WLBZ (Bangor, Maine)
 WLW (Cincinnati, Ohio)
 WNBC (New Britain, Connecticut)
 WORK (York, Pennsylvania)
 WRAW (Reading, Pennsylvania)
 WRDO (Augusta, Maine)
 WSAN (Allentown, Pennsylvania)
 WSPD (Toledo, Ohio)

Midwest affiliates

Basic

 KSD (St. Louis, Missouri)
 KSTP (St. Paul, Minnesota)
 WDAF (Kansas City, Missouri)
 WHO (Des Moines, Iowa)
 WIRE (Indianapolis, Indiana)
 WMAQ (Chicago, Illinois)
 WOC (Davenport, Iowa)
 WOW (Omaha, Nebraska)

Supplemental

 KANS (Wichita, Kansas)
 KFYR (Bismarck, North Dakota)
 KGBX (Springfield, Missouri)
 KOAM (Pittsburg, Kansas)
 KSOO (Sioux Falls, Iowa)
 WBOW (Terre Haute, Indiana)
 WCFL (Chicago, Illinois)
 WCKY (Cincinnati, Ohio)
 WDAY (Fargo, North Dakota)
 WEBC (Duluth, Minnesota)
 WGBF (Evansville, Indiana)
 WGL (Fort Wayne, Indiana)
 WIBA (Madison, Wisconsin)
 WOOD (Grand Rapids, Michigan)
 WTMJ (Milwaukee, Wisconsin)
 XEW (Mexico City, Mexico)

South affiliates

Basic

 KPRC (Houston, Texas)
 WBRC (Birmingham, Alabama)
 WJDX (Jackson, Mississippi)
 WMBG (Richmond, Virginia)
 WMC (Memphis, Tennessee)
 WSB (Atlanta, Georgia)
 WDSU (New Orleans, Louisiana)

Supplemental

 KARK (Little Rock, Arkansas)
 KFDM (Beaumont, Texas)
 KGKO (Fort Worth, Texas)
 KGNO (Dodge City, Kansas)
 KGRV (Weslaco, Texas)
 KRIS (Corpus Christi, Texas)
 KTHS (Hot Springs, Arkansas)
 KTOK (Oklahoma City, Oklahoma)
 KTSM (El Paso, Texas)
 KVOO (Tulsa, Oklahoma)
 WAPO (Chattanooga, Tennessee)
 WALA (Mobile, Alabama)
 WAVE (Louisville, Kentucky)
 WBAP (Fort Worth, Texas)
 WCSC (Charleston, South Carolina)
 WCRS (Greenwood, South Carolina)
 WFAA (Dallas, Texas)
 WFBC (Greenville, South Carolina)
 WFLA-WSUN (Tampa, Florida)
 WIOD (Miami, Florida)
 WIS (Columbia, South Carolina)
 WJAX (Jacksonville, Florida)
 WKY (Oklahoma City, Oklahoma)
 WLAK (Lakeland, Florida)
 WOAI (San Antonio, Texas)
 WPTF (Raleigh, North Carolina)
 WROL (Knoxville, Tennessee)
 WSM (Nashville, Tennessee)
 WSOC (Charlotte, North Carolina)
 WTAR (Norfolk, Virginia)
 WWNC (Asheville, North Carolina)

Mountain affiliates

Basic

KDYL (Salt Lake City, Utah)
KOA (Denver, Colorado)

Supplemental

 KGHF (Pueblo, Colorado)
 KGIR (Butte, Montana)
 KIDO (Boise, Idaho)
 KOB (Albuquerque, New Mexico)
 KPFA (Helena, Montana)
 KSEI (Pocatello, Idaho)
 KTAR (Phoenix, Arizona)
 KTFI (Twin Falls, Idaho)
 KVOA (Tucson, Arizona)

Pacific affiliates

Basic

 KFI (Los Angeles, California)
 KGW (Portland, Oregon)
 KHQ (Spokane, Washington)
 KOMO (Seattle, Washington)
 KPO (San Francisco, California)

Supplemental

 KERN (Bakersfield, California)
 KFBK (Sacramento, California)
 KGU (Honolulu, Hawaii)
 KGW (Portland, Oregon)
 KMED (Medford, Oregon)
 KMJ (Fresno, California)
 KWG (Stockton, California)

See also
 List of affiliates of the NBC Blue Network

References

External links
 List of Radio Broadcast Stations, Alphabetically by Call Letters as of January 1, 1940, Federal Communications Commission.
NBC Red Network affiliates 1939